Science, Technology, & Human Values (ST&HV) is a peer-reviewed academic journal that covers research on the relationship of science and technology with society. The journal's editor-in-chief is Edward J. Hackett (Arizona State University). From the "Newsletters of the Program on the Public Conceptions of Science" that Gerald Holton established in 1972, it became The Newsletter on Science, Technology, & Human Values, in 1976. ST&HV is published by the Society for Social Studies of Science, in conjunction with SAGE Publications.

Former editors 
The following people have served as editors-in-chief. 

 Susan Leigh Star
 Geoffrey C. Bowker
 Ulrike Felt
 Ellsowrth R. Fuhrman
 Olga Amsterdamsa
 Susan E. Cozzens
 Marcel C. LaFollette
 Vivien B. Shelanski
 William A. Blanpied

Abstracting and indexing 
Science, Technology, & Human Values is abstracted and indexed in Scopus and the Social Sciences Citation Index. According to the Journal Citation Reports, its 2018 impact factor was 3.160, ranking it 4th out of 42 journals in the category "Social Issues".

References

External links 
 

SAGE Publishing academic journals
English-language journals
Sociology journals
Publications established in 1967
Bimonthly journals
Science and technology studies journals